Paulo Jorge Roque Marques, known as Paulo Jorge (born 22 February 1963) is a former Portuguese football player and coach.

Club career
He made 7 seasons and 138 games in the Primeira Liga for Estrela Amadora, Vitória Guimarães and União Madeira.

Honours
Estrela Amadora
Taça de Portugal: 1989–90

References

External links
 

1963 births
People from Loures
Living people
Portuguese footballers
C.D. Olivais e Moscavide players
Liga Portugal 2 players
C.F. Estrela da Amadora players
Primeira Liga players
Vitória S.C. players
C.F. União players
Varzim S.C. players
Association football forwards
Portuguese football managers
Sportspeople from Lisbon District